Viktor or Victor Tikhonov may refer to:
Viktor Tikhonov (politician) (1949–2020), Ukrainian politician, member of parliament and former ambassador
Viktor Tikhonov (born 1930) (1930–2014), Soviet ice hockey player and coach
Viktor Tikhonov (born 1988), Russian ice hockey player, grandson of Viktor Vasilyevich Tikhonov (1930–2014)